Ralph Moradian (born Fresno, California 1906; died Fresno, California 1997) was a prominent lawyer, judge, and editor. He is known to be the first appointed judge in California of Armenian descent.

Life 
Moradian graduated from Fresno High School. He then attended Fresno Normal School (later Fresno State College) for two  years-all the education his mother could afford even though he held a variety of jobs as a teenager. Moradian's parents were divorced in 1911, becoming, to Moradian's knowledge, the first American-Armenians in the Fresno area to be divorced. His father, John Moradian, practiced medicene in Fresno for several years until the divorce, after which he moved to Chicago.
After leaving school Ralph Moradian worked as reporter for The Fresno Evening Herald, The Fresno Morning Republican, and The San Francisco Chronicle. In 1934, despite never attending law school, he passed the Bar and became a lawyer. He became a Deputy District Attorney, the first Armenian to serve in that position and probably the first Armenian to be appointed to a governmental position in the area. After several years he left the District Attorney's office and stayed in private practice until 1963. In October 1963, Governor Edmund G. Brown appointed Moradian to the Municipal Court, a position he held until December 1976 when he retired. He continued to serve the Family Court without pay from 1976 to 1991. After retiring the second time, he edited the Fresno County Bar Bulletin. He was the first Armenian judge to be appointed in the state of California. He died in 1997.

References

People from Fresno, California
1997 deaths
1906 births
American people of Armenian descent
20th-century American judges
California lawyers